"The Battle Hymn of Love" is a song written by Paul Overstreet and Don Schlitz, and recorded by American country music artists Kathy Mattea and Tim O'Brien. The song was recorded for Mattea's 1987 studio album Untasted Honey. It was released in July 1990 as the first single from her compilation album A Collection of Hits.  The song reached #9 on the Billboard Hot Country Singles & Tracks chart.

Chart performance

References

1987 songs
1990 singles
Kathy Mattea songs
Tim O'Brien (musician) songs
Male–female vocal duets
Songs written by Paul Overstreet
Songs written by Don Schlitz
Song recordings produced by Allen Reynolds
Mercury Records singles